Kurram Garhi is a small village located near the city of Bannu, which is the part of Khyber Pakhtunkhwa province of Pakistan. Its population is approximately 35000. Barren hills are near this village. This village is on the border of Kurram Agency. Other nearby villages are Peppal, Surwangi and Amandi Kala.

Culture 

The people of Kurram Garhi wear Shalwar-Kameez regional dress, with different designs for women. They construct houses of mud. All the people eat regional food like Dodi, Saag and other vegetables. They also eat fish, chicken, beef and mutton. They drink Lassi, .

Amenities

Hydel powerhouse 

In the neighbourhood, Kurram Garhi Hydropower Plant produces . Four turbines are installed on the Kachkot canal from the Kurram River. This powerhouse produces electricity for the people of this village as well as also for related villages. The station began operating in February 1958 with Average Annual generating capacity of 17 million units (GWh) of least expensive electricity.

Filtration plant 

In the vicinity of the village is a big water treatment plant that purifies water from the Kurram River. The water is purified for the whole village. The pure water then flows from Kurram Garhi to Bannu (approximately ). The pure water is stored in a huge tank located in Tanchi Bazar.

Graveyard 

Kurram Garhi contains a large graveyard which is used by the neighbouring villages. The graves are at Baba Sahab.

References

Populated places in Bannu District
Bannu District